Ternuvate is an urban-type settlement in Zaporizhzhia Raion of Zaporizhzhia Oblast in southern Ukraine, but was administered under Novomykolaivka Raion before 2020. Population: . Ternuvate is the administrative center of the Ternuvate Council, a local government area which beside the settlement administers also three other villages.

The settlement was first founded in 1898 as a settlement of Haichur. After the World War II it was renamed as Ternuvate.

References

External links
 

Urban-type settlements in Zaporizhzhia Raion
Populated places established in 1898
1898 establishments in the Russian Empire
Railway towns in Ukraine